(better known as Yasunori, born 7 January 1909 - died 1 March 2003) was the last Yasukuni Shrine swordsmith.

Early history
Kotani Kenzo was born on 7 January 1909 as the eldest son of a toolmaker in Kure, Hiroshima Prefecture. In his adolescent years he was apprenticed to his uncle Kajiyama Tokutaro (his mother's brother) who, along with his younger cousin Kajiyama Toshimichi, became  (sword assistants). In 1933 they were summoned to Tokyo to work at the Yasukuni Shrine.

The Army and Navy were concerned that the number of swords extant were too few to accommodate the needs of the growing officer corps. Kajiyama Yasutoku and Miyaguchi Yasuhiro were appointed as swordsmiths by Army Minister General Sadao Araki. The kanji  was taken from the shrine and affixed with a character from their personal names to form their sword names. Kotani Kenzo and his cousin Kajiyama Toshimichi were their uncle's assistants.

Yasukuni Shrine 1933–1945
In 1933, Kotani was summoned, along with his uncle and cousin, to Tokyo from Hiroshima to work at the Yasukuni shrine. On 10 July 1935 Kotani, as the senior sword student, became the next official Yasukuni Shrine swordsmith and was given the name  by the Minister of War, Lieutenant General Hayashi Senjuro.  From 1935 to 1938 he won more prizes at the shrine than his uncle and other senior swordmakers like Ikeda Yasumistu and Miyaguchi Yasuhiro. During that time, he won eight or nine prizes annually for high quality. He was selected to make swords for officers such as Field Marshal Hisaichi Terauchi and Prince Morihiro Higashikuni

Yasunori used this name throughout his time at the shrine and worked not only the longest but was the most prolific, having produced over 1600 swords during his time there. In 1938, General , aide-de-camp to the Emperor, awarded the character  from his name to Yasunori, as he had earlier done for Yasunori's uncle, Yasutoku, on 13 September 1934.

Working style
Swords made by the Kajiyama group strive to emulate the Nagamitsu/Kagemitsu style of the Kamakura period as directed by the Directors of the Nipponto Tanrankai. Sometimes  can be seen in their work, particularly in that done by Yasunori and his uncle Yasutoku. Yasutoshi (Yasunori's cousin) made his swords truer than both his father in that he made his  out of pure . However, he sometimes produced special orders with longer lengths like 69–70 cm.

When the war ended in September 1945, crafting  at the shrine ceased. Yasunori did not return to swordmaking until 1970 and stopped making swords entirely after approximately 1978.

See also
 Glossary of Japanese swords

Sources
 Fujishiro, Okisato Yasukuni-to, Token Bijutsu June 1981
 Han, Bing Siong, The Significance of the Yasukuni Shrine in Contemporary Sword History 1989
 Abdelsamad, Yahya; My Meeting with Kotani Yasunori, Token Bijutsu March 2004

1909 births
2003 deaths
Japanese swordsmiths
People from Kure, Hiroshima